Pedro Gomez (born c. 1963) is a Salsa dance instructor from Cuba.

Biography
After Gomez was born, his parents decided to abandon Cuba, perhaps to allow his son to live under  better economic conditions.

The Gomez family arrived in Puerto Rico. Salsa music had been popularized in Cuba by Celia Cruz, Olga Guillot and others, and, in Puerto Rico, it shared the general public's top spot among favorite types of music with American rock and pop music. Such stars such as El Gran Combo and Eddie Santiago were famous during the 1980s there. Gomez started to become interested in this type of music since he was a child, demonstrating ability to dance it from his early years.

Gomez tried to continue learning and practicing his dance moves as a teenager, after he had moved to Miami. Later, he went into the army and was stationed in Germany. After getting out of the Army, he worked for a while in Germany until he eventually settled in Rome, Italy.

Salsa is a growing music genre in Europe; Andy Montañez, another Puerto Rican star of the 1970s and 1980s, toured Belgium, Spain and other countries, for example. Gomez, basking in Salsa's new popularity in that continent, set a dancing school there.

Soon, Gomez became one of the best known dancing teachers in Europe, in part because people from Italy and other countries wanted to learn how to dance Salsa.

Gomez has popularized the Puerto Rican and New York City dancing styles, among others, in Italy as well as in other countries such as England and Denmark. He has also taught at schools in Muslim countries (particularly in northern Africa) as well as in South Africa.

External links

1963 births
Living people
Gomez,Pedro